The scissor-tailed flycatcher (Tyrannus forficatus), also known as the Texas bird-of-paradise and swallow-tailed flycatcher, is a long-tailed bird of the genus Tyrannus, whose members are collectively referred to as kingbirds. The kingbirds are a group of large insectivorous (insect-eating) birds in the tyrant flycatcher (Tyrannidae) family. The scissor-tailed flycatcher is found in North and Central America.

Latin name and etymology

Its former Latin name was Muscivora forficata. The former genus name Muscivora derives from the Latin words for 'fly' and 'to devour', while the species name forficata derives from the Latin word for 'scissors'. The scissortail is now considered to be a member of the Tyrannus, or 'tyrant-like' genus. This genus earned its name because several of its species are extremely aggressive on their breeding territories, where they will attack larger birds such as crows, hawks and owls.

Description
Adult birds have pale gray heads and upper parts, light underparts, salmon-pink flanks and undertail coverts, and dark gray wings. Axillars and patch on underwing coverts are red. Their extremely long, forked tails, which are black on top and white on the underside, are characteristic and unmistakable. Immature birds are duller in color and have shorter tails.

They build a cup nest in isolated trees or shrubs, sometimes using artificial sites such as telephone poles near towns. The male performs a spectacular aerial display during courtship with his long tail forks streaming out behind him. Both parents feed the young. Like other kingbirds, they are very aggressive in defending their nest. Clutches contain three to six eggs.

In the summer, scissor-tailed flycatchers feed mainly on insects (grasshoppers, robber-flies, and dragonflies), which they may catch by waiting on a perch and then flying out to catch them in flight (hawking). For additional food in the winter they will also eat some berries.

Their breeding habitat is open shrubby country with scattered trees in the south-central states of Texas, Oklahoma, Kansas; western portions of Louisiana, Arkansas, and Missouri; far eastern New Mexico; and northeastern Mexico. Reported sightings record occasional stray visitors as far north as southern Canada and as far east as Florida and Georgia. They migrate through Texas and eastern Mexico to their winter non-breeding range, from southern Mexico to Panama. Pre-migratory roosts and flocks flying south may contain as many as 1000 birds.

The scissor-tailed flycatcher is the state bird of Oklahoma, and is displayed in flight with tail feathers spread on the reverse of the Oklahoma Commemorative Quarter. Professional soccer team FC Tulsa features a scissor-tailed flycatcher on their crest. The scissor-tailed flycatcher is also displayed in the background of the current license plate.

In eastern Arkansas and western Tennessee, USA, there is a hybrid zone between the scissor-tailed flycatcher and the western kingbird, which are sympatric, ecologically similar sister species. Both these species have simultaneously expanded their breeding ranges eastward over the past 50 years

Gallery

References

External links

 
 Scissor-tailed flycatcher - Tyrannus forficatus - USGS Patuxent Bird Identification InfoCenter
 Stamps for El Salvador, Nicaragua, United States at bird-stamps.org
 
 
 Birds of Oklahoma: Scissor-tailed Flycatcher, Oklahoma's State Bird (with link to image gallery)
 
 

scissor-tailed flycatcher
Native birds of the Plains-Midwest (United States)
Birds of the Rio Grande valleys
Birds of Mexico
Symbols of Oklahoma
scissor-tailed flycatcher
scissor-tailed flycatcher